Mahesh Bhupathi and Max Mirnyi were the defending champions, but decided not to participate together.

Bhupathi played alongside Leander Paes but were eliminated in the second round, while Mirnyi partnered up with Daniel Nestor but were eliminated in the semifinals.

In the final, Rohan Bopanna and Aisam-ul-Haq Qureshi won the title beating French wildcards Julien Benneteau and Nicolas Mahut 6–2, 6–4.

Seeds

Draw

Finals

Top half

Bottom half

References
 Main Draw

BNP Paribas Masters - Doubles
2011 BNP Paribas Masters